This is a list of TrackIR Enhanced PC games.

#
 18 Wheels of Steel: American Long Haul - [Yaw, Pitch, X, Y, Z]
 18 Wheels of Steel: Extreme Trucker 2 - [Yaw, Pitch, X, Y, Z]
 18 Wheels of Steel: Extreme Trucker - [Yaw, Pitch, X, Y, Z]
 18 Wheels Of Steel: Haulin' - [Yaw, Pitch, X, Y, Z]

A
 Aces High 2 - [Yaw, Pitch, Roll, X, Y, Z]
 AeroFly 5 - [Yaw, Pitch, Roll, X, Y, Z]
 Aerofly FS - [Yaw, Pitch, Roll, X, Y, Z]
 Air Battles: Sky Defender - [Yaw, Pitch, Roll, X, Y, Z]
 Air Missions: Hind - [Yaw, Pitch, Roll]
 America's Army - [Yaw, Pitch] v2.8.2 only in HMMWV vehicle
 American Truck Simulator - [Yaw, Pitch, X, Y, Z]
 Apache: Air Assault - [Yaw, Pitch, Roll, X, Y, Z]
 ArmA: Armed Assault - [Yaw, Pitch, X, Z]
 ARMA 2 - [Yaw, Pitch, X, Z]
 ARMA 2: Operation Arrowhead - [Yaw, Pitch, Roll, X, Z]
 Arma 2: Reinforcements - [Yaw, Pitch, Roll, X, Z]
 Arma 3 - [Yaw, Pitch, Roll, X, Z]
 Arvoch Alliance - [Yaw, Pitch, Roll, X, Y, Z]
 Arvoch Conflict - [Yaw, Pitch, Roll, X, Y, Z]
 Assetto Corsa - [Yaw, Pitch, Roll, X, Y, Z]
 Assetto Corsa Competizione - [Yaw, Pitch, Roll, X, Y, Z]
 Automobilista - [Yaw, Pitch, Roll, X, Y, Z]
 Automobilista 2 - [Yaw, Pitch, Roll, X, Y, Z]

B
 BeamNG.drive - [Yaw, Pitch, Roll, X, Y, Z]
 Rowan's Battle of Britain - [Yaw, Pitch]
 Battle of Britain II: Wings of Victory - [Yaw, Pitch, Roll, X, Y, Z]
 Battleground Europe: World War II Online - [Yaw, Pitch]
 Beyond the Red Line (FreeSpace 2 mod) - [Yaw, Pitch, Roll, X, Y, Z]
 BOMB: Who let the dogfight? - [Yaw, Pitch, Roll, X, Y, Z]

C
 The Crew - [Yaw, Pitch, Roll, X, Y, Z]
 Colin McRae Rally 2004 - [Yaw, Pitch, Roll, X, Y, Z]
 Combat Air Patrol 2 - [Yaw, Pitch, Roll, X, Y, Z]
 Combat Flight Simulator 3: Battle for Europe - [Yaw, Pitch, X, Y, Z]
 Combat Helo - [Yaw, Pitch, Roll, X, Y, Z]
 Saitek Combat Pilot - [Yaw, Pitch, Roll, X, Y, Z]
 Condor: The Competition Soaring Simulator - [Yaw, Pitch]
 Condor 2: The Complete Soaring Simulator - [Yaw, Pitch]
 Crashday - [Yaw, Pitch]
 Cross Racing Championship Extreme 2005 - [Yaw, Pitch, Roll, X, Y, Z]

D
 Darkfield VR - [Yaw, Pitch, Roll, X, Y, Z]
 DayZ - [Yaw, Pitch, Roll, X, Z]
 DayZ Mod - [Yaw, Pitch, X, Z]
 DCS: Black Shark - [Yaw, Pitch, Roll, X, Y, Z]
 DCS: Black Shark 2 - [Yaw, Pitch, Roll, X, Y, Z]
 DCS: A-10C - [Yaw, Pitch, Roll, X, Y, Z]
 Descent: D2X-XL - [Yaw, Pitch, Roll, X, Y, Z]
 DiRT - [Yaw, Pitch, Roll, X, Y, Z]
 DiRT 2 - [Yaw, Pitch, Roll, X, Y, Z]
 DiRT 3 - [Yaw, Pitch, Roll, X, Y, Z]
 Dirt Rally - [Yaw, Pitch, Roll, X, Y, Z]
 Dirt Rally 2.0 - [Yaw, Pitch, Roll, X, Y, Z]
 Diaspora: Shattered Armistice - [Yaw, Pitch, Roll, X, Y, Z]
 Dovetail Flight School - [Yaw, Pitch, Roll, X, Y, Z]
 Dovetail Train Simulator 2015 - [Yaw, Pitch, Roll, X, Y, Z]

E
 Elite: Dangerous - [Yaw, Pitch, Roll, X, Y, Z]
 Enemy Engaged: RAH-66 Comanche vs. KA-52 Hokum - [Yaw, Pitch, Roll, X, Y, Z]
 Enemy Engaged 2 - [Yaw, Pitch]
 Euro Truck Simulator - [Yaw, Pitch, X, Y, Z]
 Euro Truck Simulator 2 - [Yaw, Pitch, X, Y, Z]
 Evochron Alliance 2.0 - [Yaw, Pitch, Roll, X, Y, Z]
 Evochron Legends - [Yaw, Pitch, Roll, X, Y, Z]
 Evochron Mercenary - [Yaw, Pitch, Roll, X, Y, Z]
 Evochron Renegades - [Yaw, Pitch, Roll, X, Y, Z]
 EZCA (Flight Simulator X mod) - [Yaw, Pitch, Roll, X, Y, Z]

F
 F-22 Total Air War - [Yaw, Pitch]
 F1 Challenge - [Yaw, Pitch]
 Falcon 4.0 - [Yaw, Pitch]
 Falcon BMS 4.32 Update 7 - [Yaw, Pitch, Roll, X, Y, Z]
 Falcon BMS 4.33 Update 1-5 - [Yaw, Pitch, Roll, X, Y, Z]
 Falcon 4.0: Allied Force - [Yaw, Pitch]
 Falcon 4.0 FreeFalcon4/RedViper - [Yaw, Pitch, Roll, X, Y, Z]
 Falcon 4.0 FreeFalcon5 - [Yaw, Pitch, Roll, X, Y, Z]
 Falcon 4.0 Open Falcon - [Yaw, Pitch, Roll, X, Y, Z]
 Farming Simulator 17 - [Yaw, Pitch, X, Y, Z]
 Farming Simulator 19 - [Yaw, Pitch, X, Y, Z]
 First Eagles: The Great War 1918 - [Yaw, Roll, X, Y, Z]
 Flight Simulator 2002 - [Yaw, Pitch] 
 Flight Simulator 2004: A Century of Flight - [Yaw, Pitch, Roll, X, Y, Z]
 Flight Simulator X - [Yaw, Pitch, Roll, X, Y, Z]
 Flyboys - [Yaw, Pitch]
 Future Pinball - [Yaw, Pitch, X, Y, Z]
 FreeSpace 2 Open - [Yaw, Pitch, Roll, X, Y, Z]

G
 Garry's Mod - [Yaw, Pitch, Roll, X, Y, Z]
 GTR - [Yaw, Pitch, Roll, X, Y, Z]
 GTR 2 - [Yaw, Pitch, Roll, X, Y, Z]
 GT Legends - [Yaw, Pitch, Roll, X, Y, Z]
 Grand Prix Legends - [Yaw, Pitch, X, Y, Z] using GPLShift 7.3.2
 Race Driver: GRID - [Yaw, Pitch, Roll, X, Y, Z]

H
 Harrier Attack II - [Yaw, Pitch, X, Y, Z]

I
 IL-2 Sturmovik: Forgotten Battles - [Yaw, Pitch]
 IL-2 Sturmovik: 1946 - [Yaw, Pitch] or [Yaw, Pitch, Roll, X, Y, Z] with 6DOF Mod
 IL-2 Sturmovik: Cliffs of Dover - [Yaw, Pitch, Roll, X, Y, Z]
 IL-2 Sturmovik: Great Battles - [Yaw, Pitch, Roll, X, Y, Z]
 Insurgency: Modern Infantry Combat (Half-Life 2 mod) - [Yaw, Pitch, Roll]
 iRacing - [Yaw, Pitch, Roll, X, Y, Z]

J
 Jane's F/A-18  - [Yaw, Pitch]
 JetPakNG (Flight Simulator 2004 mod)  - [Yaw, Pitch, Roll, X, Y, Z]
 Jumpgate: The Reconstruction Initiative  - [Yaw, Pitch]
 Jumpgate Evolution  - [Yaw, Pitch]

K
 Kerbal Space Program - [Yaw, Pitch, X, Y, Z]

L
 Live for Speed - [Yaw, Pitch, Roll, X, Y, Z]
 Lock On: Modern Air Combat  - [Yaw, Pitch]
 Lock On 1.1: Flaming Cliffs  - [Yaw, Pitch, Z]
 Lock On: Flaming Cliffs 2  - [Yaw, Pitch, Roll, Z]
 LunarPilot (Flight Simulator 2004 mod) - [Yaw, Pitch, Roll, X, Y, Z]

M
 M4 Tank Platoon
 MechWarrior Online
 Mediterranean Air War (Combat Flight Simulator 3 mod) - [Yaw, Pitch, X, Y, Z]
 Micro Flight - [Yaw, Pitch] 
 Microsoft Flight Simulator (2020) - [Yaw, Pitch, Roll, X, Y, Z]
 Microsoft ESP (Flight Simulator X mod) - [Yaw, Pitch, Roll, X, Y, Z]
 MiG Alley - [Yaw, Pitch, Roll, X, Y, Z]
 Miner Wars - [Yaw, Pitch, Roll, X, Y, Z]
 Miscreated - [Yaw, Pitch, Roll, X, Y, Z]

N
 NASCAR Racing 2003 Season - [Yaw, Pitch, Roll, X, Y, Z]
 NASCAR SimRacing - [Yaw, Pitch, Roll, X, Y, Z]
 netKar Pro - [Yaw, Pitch, Roll, X, Y, Z]
 Nitro Stunt Racing - [Yaw, Pitch, Roll, X, Y, Z]

O
 OMSI - The Bus Simulator - [Yaw, Pitch, Roll, X, Y, Z]
 Operation Flashpoint: Dragon Rising - [Yaw, Pitch] only in vehicles
 Operation Flashpoint: Red River - [Yaw, Pitch] only in vehicles
 Over Flanders Field (Combat Flight Simulator 3 mod) - [Yaw, Pitch, X, Y, Z]
 OMSI 2

P
 Pacific Fighters - [Yaw, Pitch]
 Project Cars - [Yaw, Pitch, Roll, X, Y, Z]
 Project Cars 2 - [Yaw, Pitch, Roll, X, Y, Z]
 Project Torque - [Yaw, Pitch, Roll, X, Y, Z]
 Prepar3D (Flight Simulator X mod) - [Yaw, Pitch, Roll, X, Y, Z]

R
 RACE - The Official WTCC Game - [Yaw, Pitch, Roll, X, Y, Z]
 RACE 07 - Official WTCC Game - [Yaw, Pitch, Roll, X, Y, Z]
 Rail Simulator
 RailWorks 2
 RealFlight - [Yaw, Pitch, Roll, X, Y, Z]
 Red Baron 3D - [Yaw, Pitch]
 rFactor - [Yaw, Pitch, Roll, X, Y, Z]
 rFactor 2 - [Yaw, Pitch, Roll, X, Y, Z]
 Richard Burns Rally - [Yaw, Pitch]
 Rise of Flight - [Yaw, Pitch, Roll, X, Y, Z]
 Rise: The Vieneo Province - [Yaw, Pitch, Roll, X, Y, Z]
 Rust - [Yaw, Pitch, X, Y, Z]

S
 Ship Simulator 2006 - [Yaw, Pitch, Roll, X, Y, Z]
 Ship Simulator 2008 - [Yaw, Pitch, X, Y, Z]
 Silent Wings - [Yaw, Pitch, Roll, X, Y, Z]
 Sir, You Are Being Hunted - [Yaw, Pitch, Roll, X]
 Simax Simulation Driving Simulator - [Yaw, Pitch, X, Y, Z] software not available separately.
 Space Shuttle Mission 2007 - [Yaw, Pitch, X, Y, Z]
 Starshatter - [Yaw, Pitch, X, Y, Z]
 Star Citizen - [Yaw, Pitch, Roll, X, Y, Z]
 Star Wars Galaxies: Jump to Lightspeed - [Yaw, Pitch]
 Strike Fighters: Project 1 - [Yaw, Pitch,  X, Y, Z]
 Strike Fighters 2 - [Yaw, Pitch,  X, Y, Z]
 Superkarting Demo - [Yaw, Pitch, Z]

T
 Targetware Series - [Yaw, Pitch]
 Test Drive Unlimited - [Yaw, Pitch]
 theHunter - [Yaw, Pitch, Roll, X, Y, Z]
 thriXXX Technology Series - [Yaw, Pitch, Roll, X, Y, Z]
 TOCA Race Driver 2 - [Yaw, Pitch, Roll, X, Y, Z]
 Tom Clancy's H.A.W.X - [Yaw, Pitch, X, Y, Z]
 Tom Clancy's H.A.W.X 2  - [Yaw, Pitch, X, Y, Z]
 Tower Simulator - [Yaw, Pitch, Z]
 Train Sim World 2 - [Yaw, Pitch, X, Y, Z]
 Trainz Railroad Simulator 2006 - [Yaw, Pitch]
 Trainz Classic - [Yaw, Pitch]
 Trainz Simulator 2010 - [Yaw, Pitch]
 Turismo Carretera - [Yaw, Pitch, Roll, X, Y, Z]

V
 VBS2
 Vehicle Simulator - [Yaw, Pitch]
 Virtual Sailor - [Yaw, Pitch]

W
 WarBirds - [Yaw, Pitch]
 War Thunder - [Yaw, Pitch, X, Y, Z]
 Wings of Prey - [Yaw, Pitch, Roll, X, Y, Z]
 Wings of War - [Yaw, Pitch, Roll, X, Y, Z]
 Wings Over Europe - [Yaw, Pitch, X, Y, Z]
 Wings Over Flanders Fields:U.E. - [Yaw, Pitch, X, Y, Z]
 Wings Over Israel - [Yaw, Pitch, X, Y, Z]
 Wings Over The Reich - [Yaw, Pitch, X, Y, Z]
 Wings Over Vietnam - [Yaw, Pitch, X, Y, Z]
 WWII Battle Tanks: T-34 vs. Tiger - [Yaw, Pitch]

X
 X Motor Racing - [Yaw, Pitch, Roll, X, Y, Z]
 X3: Albion Prelude - [Yaw, Pitch]
 X: Rebirth - [Yaw, Pitch]
 X-Plane - [Yaw, Pitch, X, Y, Z]

See also
List of games compatible with FreeTrack

References

External links
 Official list of TrackIR Enhanced games

TrackIR